Sleepsack or sleep sack can refer to:
 An infant sleeping bag, a bag-like garment or covering worn by infants for sleeping
 Sleepsack (BDSM), a type of bondage gear